Musaylima, otherwise known as Maslama ibn Ḥabīb d.632, was a preacher of monotheism from the Banu Hanifa tribe, of which present day descendants include the House of Saud among other Najd tribes. Based from Diriyah in present day Riyadh, Saudi Arabia, he claimed to be a prophet in 7th-century Arabia. He was a leader during the Ridda wars. He is considered by Muslims to be a false prophet ( al-Kadhāb). He is commonly called Musaylima al-Kadhdhāb (Musaylima the Arch-Liar).

Etymology
Musaylima's real name was Maslama ibn Habib, but Muslims altered his name to Musaylima, which is the diminutive of Maslama (i.e., 'Little Maslama').

Early life
Musaylima was the son of Habib, of the tribe Banu Hanifa, one of the largest tribes of Arabia that inhabited the region of Najd. The Banu Hanifa were a Hanafite Christian branch of Banu Bakr and led an independent existence prior to Islam.

Among the first records of him is in late 9th Hijri, the Year of Delegations, when he accompanied a delegation of his tribe to Medina. The delegation included two other prominent Muslims. They would later help Musaylima rise to power and save their tribe from destruction. These men were Nahar Ar-Rajjal bin Unfuwa (or Rahhal) and Muja'a bin Marara.  In Medina, the deputation stayed with the daughter of al-Harith, a woman of the Ansar from the Banu Najjar. When the delegation arrived at Medina the camels were tied in a traveler's camp, and Musaylima remained there to look after them while the other delegates went in.

They had talks with Muhammad. The delegation before their departure embraced Islam and renounced Christianity without compunction. As was his custom, Muhammad presented gifts to the delegates, and when they had received their gifts one said, "We left one of our comrades in the camp to look after our mounts."

Muhammad gave them gifts for him also, and added, "He is not the least among you that he should stay behind to guard the property of his comrades." On their return they converted the tribe of Banu Hanifa to Islam. They built a mosque at al-Yamama and started regular prayers.

Proclaiming prophethood and teachings      
Musaylima's followers survived at least till the 17th century. At the Mughal ruler Akbar's council of religions, a discussion of Musaylima religion also took place with the help of its priests.
His teachings were almost lost but a neutral review of them does exist in Dabestan-e Mazaheb. 
Muslim writers often portray Musaylima negatively. But he gives a fascinating picture into 7th century Arabia where religious reformations were taking place and people were eager to accept new ideas, including that of Muhammad and his contemporary Musaylima. Musaylima claimed he received numerous revelations from God just like Muhammad did. Musaylima gathered an army of 40,000 followers.

According to the account of Musaylima in the Dabestan-e Mazaheb (authored mid-17th century), he taught 3 daily prayers to God, facing any direction. He criticized Muslims for selecting the Ka'aba as the direction of prayers, arguing that God is not limited to one direction. Musaylima declared that the Ka'aba was not the House of God, because an all-powerful God has no house. Musaylima said fasting should be at night instead of daytime during Ramadan. He prohibited circumcision. Musaylima considered men and women equal, and allowed premarital sex. Musaylima prohibited polygamy and cousin marriage. Musaylima declared that any slave who converted to his religion would become free. Musaylima stated that Iblis did not exist, because a fair and merciful God would not allow a being like Iblis to throw people into error. Musaylima also said it was wrong to include his name or any prophet’s name in worship to God.

Musaylima, who is alleged as having been a skilled magician by Muslim historians, dazzled the crowd with miracles. He could put an egg in a bottle; he could cut off the feathers of a bird and then stick them on so the bird would fly again; and he used this skill to persuade the people that he was divinely gifted.

Musaylima shared verses purporting them to have been revelations from God. Thereafter, some of the people accepted him as a prophet alongside Muhammad. Gradually the influence and authority of Musaylima increased with the people of his tribe. He gathered an army of 40,000 followers. He also took to addressing gatherings as a messenger of Allah just like Muhammad, and would compose verses and offer them, as Qur'anic revelations. 

Al-Tabari in his History of the Prophets and Kings chronicles that Musaylima also proposed to share power over Arabia with Muhammad. Then one day, in late 10 Hijri, he wrote to Muhammad:

Muhammad, however, replied back:

Personal life
During the Ridda wars which emerged following the death of Muhammad, Sajah bint al-Harith declared that she was a prophetess after learning that Musaylima and Tulayha had declared prophethood. 4,000 people gathered around her to march on Medina. Others joined her against Medina. However, her planned attack on Medina was called off after she learned that the army of Khalid ibn al-Walid had defeated Tulayha al-Asadi (another self-proclaimed prophet). Thereafter, she sought cooperation with Musaylima to oppose the threat of Khalid. A mutual understanding was initially reached with Musaylima. Later, the two married and she accepted his self-declared prophethood. Khalid then defeated the remaining rebellious elements around Sajah, and then moved on to defeat Musaylima.

Death 
Musaylima fought and was killed in the Battle of Yamama.

See also
 Al-Aswad Al-Ansi
 Ibn an-Nawwaha
 Non-Muslim interactants with Muslims during Muhammad's era
 Ridda wars
 Saf ibn Sayyad
 Sajah bint Harith
 Tulayha

References

 

Year of birth unknown
633 deaths
Medieval Arabs killed in battle
Former Christians
Opponents of Muhammad
Arab prophets
People of the Ridda Wars
Self-declared messiahs
632 deaths